Stefan Lewandowski (30 May 1930 – 2 December 2007) was a Polish middle-distance runner. He competed in the men's 800 metres at the 1960 Summer Olympics.

References

1930 births
2007 deaths
Athletes (track and field) at the 1952 Summer Olympics
Athletes (track and field) at the 1960 Summer Olympics
Polish male middle-distance runners
Olympic athletes of Poland
Sportspeople from Gdańsk
People from the Free City of Danzig